Granieri is a southern Italian village and hamlet (frazione) of Caltagirone (18 km far), a municipality in the province of Catania, Sicily. It has an altitude of 351 metres above sea level and a population of 400.

Cuisine
The village lies in an area where vineyards are cultivated and wine is produced. It is known for its Granieri Cake.

Gallery

References

External links

Granieri official site

Frazioni of the Province of Catania
Caltagirone